Gaspare Maria Paoletti (December 6, 1727 - February 19, 1813) was a Neoclassical sculptor and architect, active mainly in his native Florence, region of Tuscany, Italy.

Biography
Paoletti mainly worked for the Tuscan Grand-Dukes of the Hapsburg-Lorraine, and its successors. He became a professor at the Accademia di Belle Arti di Firenze. Among his works are the Palazzina della Meridiana (1775), the White Hall (1776), and the Museum of La Specola, all attached to the Palazzo Pitti. He helped redecorate the Sala della Niobe in the Uffizi Gallery. He worked extensively at the Villa di Poggio Imperiale (1776-1783), and a number of structures at Montecatini Terme (1780). For the latter, he designed the Terme Leopoldine, Bagno del Tettuccio, the Palazzina Reale,  and the Locanda Maggiore.

Among his pupils were Giuseppe Manetti, Giuseppe Cacialli, Cosimo Rossi Melocchi, and Pasquale Poccianti.

Note

Bibliography
Biography with some photos
July 2014
Paraphrased from Italian Wikipedia entry.

1727 births
1813 deaths
18th-century Italian architects
19th-century Italian architects
Italian neoclassical architects
Architects from Florence